Charles Marmaduke Evan-Thomas  (5 November 1897 – 28 March 1953) was a Welsh first-class cricketer and Royal Navy officer.

The son of Algernon Ham Evan-Thomas and Lillian Watson Lee, he was born in November 1897 on the family estate at Builth Wells, Brecknockshire. He attended the Royal Naval College, Osborne from where he graduated into the Royal Navy. He served during the First World War, after which he made his debut in first-class cricket for the Royal Navy Cricket Club, making two first-class appearances in 1919 and 1920 against Cambridge University at Fenner's. He later made a third appearance in first-class cricket for the Marylebone Cricket Club against the Royal Navy at Chatham in 1929. He ended his naval career as a commander, later becoming a justice of the peace. Evan-Thomas died in March 1953 at Llanwrtyd Wells, Brecknockshire. His uncle was Admiral Sir Hugh Evan-Thomas. His brother-in-law, Cyril Stileman, also played first-class cricket.

References

External links

1897 births
1953 deaths
People from Builth Wells
Sportspeople from Powys
People educated at the Royal Naval College, Osborne
Royal Navy officers
Royal Navy personnel of World War I
Welsh cricketers
Royal Navy cricketers
Marylebone Cricket Club cricketers